Garry Peter Cook (born 10 January 1958) is a former British track and field athlete, who competed mainly in the 800 metres with a best time of 1:44.55 minutes.

Athletics career
He competed for Great Britain in the 1984 Summer Olympics held in Los Angeles, United States in the 4 x 400 metre relay where he won the Silver medal with his teammates Kriss Akabusi, Todd Bennett and Philip Brown. He was a world record holder in the rarely run 4×800 m relay as a part of a quartet that also contained Peter Elliott, Steve Cram and Sebastian Coe. They ran a time of 7 minutes 3.89 seconds on 30 August 1982 at Crystal Palace.

He represented England in the 800 metres event, at the 1978 Commonwealth Games in Edmonton, Alberta, Canada. Four years later he represented England and won a gold medal in the 4 x 400 metres relay, at the 1982 Commonwealth Games in Brisbane, Queensland, Australia, he also competed in the 800 metres event.

Personal life
After a successful athletics career, Cook qualified and has since practiced as a teacher specialising in Physical Education and Geography. He is married to former fellow Olympian Kathy Cook; they have three children, Sarah (1988), Matthew (1989) and George (1992) and reside in Walsall, England.

References

1958 births
Living people
English male sprinters
English male middle-distance runners
Olympic athletes of Great Britain
Olympic silver medallists for Great Britain
Commonwealth Games medallists in athletics
Athletes (track and field) at the 1978 Commonwealth Games
Athletes (track and field) at the 1982 Commonwealth Games
Athletes (track and field) at the 1984 Summer Olympics
World Athletics Championships athletes for Great Britain
World Athletics Championships medalists
European Athletics Championships medalists
Medalists at the 1984 Summer Olympics
Olympic silver medalists in athletics (track and field)
Commonwealth Games gold medallists for England
Universiade medalists in athletics (track and field)
Universiade silver medalists for Great Britain
Medalists at the 1979 Summer Universiade
Medallists at the 1982 Commonwealth Games